Jennie is a 1940 American drama film directed by David Burton and written by Harold Buchman and Maurice Rapf. The film stars Virginia Gilmore, William "Bill" Henry, George Montgomery, Ludwig Stössel, Dorris Bowdon and Rand Brooks. The film was released on December 20, 1940, by 20th Century Fox.

Plot

Cast    
Virginia Gilmore as Jennie Collins
William "Bill" Henry as George Schermer
George Montgomery as Franz Schermer
Ludwig Stössel as Fritz Schermer
Dorris Bowdon as Lottie Schermer
Rand Brooks as Karl Schermer
Joan Valerie as Clara Schermer
Rita Quigley as Amelia Schermer
Hermine Sterler as Mother Schermer
Harlan Briggs as Mr. Veitch
Irving Bacon as Real Estate Broker
Almira Sessions as Mrs. Willoughby
Aldrich Bowker as Dr. Hildebrand
Marie Blake as Secondary Role

References

External links 
 

1940 films
20th Century Fox films
American drama films
1940 drama films
Films directed by David Burton
American black-and-white films
1940s English-language films
1940s American films
Films with screenplays by Maurice Rapf